Valerie Susan Isham (born 1947) is a British applied probabilist and former President of the Royal Statistical Society.
Isham's research interests in include point processes, spatial processes, spatio-temporal processes and population processes.

Education and career
Isham went to Imperial College London (B.Sc., Ph.D.) where she was a student of statistician David Cox. She has been a professor of probability and statistics at University College London since 1992.

Book
Isham is the coauthor with Cox of the book Point Processes (Chapman & Hall, 1980).

Recognition
Isham was the president of the Royal Statistical Society for 2011–2012. She was awarded its Guy Medal in Bronze in 1990.
In 2018 she received the Forder Lectureship from the London Mathematical Society and the New Zealand Mathematical Society.

References

Probability theorists
20th-century British mathematicians
21st-century British mathematicians
British statisticians
Women mathematicians
Women statisticians
1947 births
Living people
Academics of University College London
Presidents of the Royal Statistical Society